Becks Grove Airport  is a privately owned, public use airport located eight nautical miles (9 mi, 15 km) northwest of the central business district of Rome, a city in Oneida County, New York, United States.

The former airport code for Becks Grove was NY45. It was changed to K16 in the early 2000s.

Facilities and aircraft 
Becks Grove Airport covers an area of 120 acres (49 ha) at an elevation of 450 feet (137 m) above mean sea level. It has one runway designated 6/24 with an asphalt surface measuring 3,000 by 23 feet (914 x 7 m).

For the 12-month period ending October 7, 2011, the airport had 6,050 aircraft operations, an average of 16 per day: 99% general aviation and 1% military. At that time there were 11 aircraft based at this airport: 91% single-engine and 9% helicopter.

References

External links 
 Becks Grove (K16) at NYSDOT Airport Directory
 Aerial image as of May 1994 from USGS The National Map
 

Airports in New York (state)
Transportation buildings and structures in Oneida County, New York